Miss Guam is a national beauty pageant in Guam.

History

1965-2000
Miss Guam was founded in 1965 by the Guam Beauty Organization to spread the håfa adai spirit, promote and showcase Guam culture and to make friends from around the globe. In early Miss Guam selected the winner to Miss Universe. Since 2008, the winner represents Guam at the Miss Universe pageant and additionally Guam returned to Miss International and from Miss Guam org. a runner-up represents Guam at the Miss International pageant.

2008-Present
In 2008, Miss Guam was renamed as Miss Universe Guam to choose representatives for the Miss Universe and Miss International pageants. Since that year, Miss Universe Guam has two official licenses for the island. Meanwhile, the representative for Miss World is selected by Miss World Guam pageant since 2011.

Titleholders

Miss Guam Universe

Miss Guam International

Miss Guam has competed since 1964. There are four Miss Guam titleholders in 1979, 1982, 1988 and 1991 who awarded as Miss Friendship in Miss International history. Margaret Frances Glover (Miss International Guam 1967) is the only one Miss Guam who placed as the Top 15 at the Miss International pageant. Since 2010 the second title of Miss Guam automatically will compete at the Miss International pageant.

References

External links
 Official website
 

Guam
Beauty pageants in Guam
Guamanian awards